Delhi Kishanganj railway station is a railway station situated in Old Rohtak Rd, Sarai Rohilla, Delhi NCT of Delhi. Its code is DKZ. The station is part of  Delhi Suburban Railway. The station consists of three platforms.

Trains 

 Sirsa Express

See also

 Hazrat Nizamuddin railway station
 New Delhi Railway Station
 Delhi Junction Railway station
 Anand Vihar Railway Terminal
 Sarai Rohilla Railway Station
 Delhi Metro

References

External links

Railway stations in New Delhi district
Delhi railway division